William Clarence John McCarver (born 19 December 1896 Fort Worth, Texas, died 21 June 1959, Waco, Texas) was an American racecar driver.

McCarver worked for Chevrolet for nearly 20 years as an engineer and test driver, and his work with them led to him taking up a racing career. He later worked as a used car salesman in Dallas, Texas, before retiring due to ill health in 1957 - ill health taking his life two years later.

http://www.oldracingcars.com/driver/Jack_McCarver

Indy 500 results

References

Indianapolis 500 drivers
1896 births
1959 deaths
Racing drivers from Fort Worth, Texas
Racing drivers from Texas
Sportspeople from Fort Worth, Texas